Garrick Jones (born December 2, 1978, in Little Rock, Arkansas) is a former professional Canadian football offensive tackle. He was signed by the Jacksonville Jaguars as an undrafted free agent in 2002. He played college football for the Arkansas State Red Wolves

Jones has been a member of the Winnipeg Blue Bombers, Kansas City Chiefs, Houston Texans, Atlanta Falcons, Calgary Stampeders and Edmonton Eskimos.

Jones is now Commissioner & CEO of the States Developmental Football League who is a veteran of three professional football leagues. Garrick is also President of the Huddle Up Foundation of Houston and played five seasons in the National Football League and five seasons in the Canadian Football League, which was highlighted by signing his first NFL contract after forgoing his senior season at Arkansas States University due to personal issues. Garrick currently sits on the Board of Directors for the NFLPA Houston Chapter and the Advisory Board for IMPACT Sports LLC, which is a company focused on the development of concussion reducing helmets for all athletes.

External links
Just Sports Stats

1978 births
Living people
American football offensive tackles
American players of Canadian football
Arkansas State Red Wolves football players
Atlanta Falcons players
Calgary Stampeders players
Canadian football offensive linemen
Edmonton Elks players
Houston Texans players
Jacksonville Jaguars players
Kansas City Chiefs players
Sportspeople from Little Rock, Arkansas
Winnipeg Blue Bombers players